Baba Yadav is an Indian film choreographer and director in Bengali and Hindi cinema.

Filmography

Director

Choreographer

References

External links
 

Living people
Indian film choreographers
21st-century Indian film directors
Bengali film directors
Indian Hindus
Bengali Hindus
Year of birth missing (living people)
Film directors from Kolkata